Ekaterina Georgiewna Reineke Czerniakowska (1892–1942) was a Soviet botanist and taxonomist of higher plants.

Biography

She was born in 1892 in the city of Konin, Kalisz Governorate of the Russian Empire, now Poland.

She graduated from the Higher Women's Natural Science courses. Since 1913, she worked as an employee of the Imperial Botanical Garden (now the Botanical Garden of Peter the Great).

In 1924, she participated in an expedition to the Turkmen Oblast, and in 1924–1925, she was on an expedition to Persia.

She lived in Leningrad on the 11th line of Vasilievsky Island, house 42, and also on Pesochnaya Street, house 1/2. She worked in the Herbarium of the Botanical Institute of the Russian Academy of Sciences. During the Siege of Leningrad, she remained in besieged Leningrad. The herbarium collections were not evacuated, but the most valuable objects were moved to the basement; some of the collections were packed and prepared for possible evacuation.

She died in 1942 during the siege from dystrophy. She was buried in the Serafimovskoe Cemetery.

Accomplishments
Czerniakowska published the names of at least 69 plants.

Archives at the Russian Academy of Sciences 
Czerniakowska E. G. Khorasan and Seistan (botanical and agronomic essay of Eastern Persia) / / Proceedings on applied botany, genetics and breeding, vol. XXIII. – 1930.
Czerniakowska E. G. Genus krasodnev Hemerocallis L / / Flora of the USSR. M-L: 1935.
Czerniakowska E. G. Essay on the vegetation of Kopet-dag / / Izvestiya Glavnogo Botanic Garden of the USSR. — 1927. – Vol. 26. – Issue 2. – pp. 253–266.
Czerniakowska E. G. Genus 260. Timeless autumnal Colchicum (Tourn.) L / / Flora of the USSR : in 30 t. / gl. ed. V. L. Komarov — – L.: USSR Academy of Sciences Publishing House, 1935. – Vol. 4 / ed. vol. V. L. Komarov. – p. 23–31 — – 760, XXX p — 5175 экз.
Czerniakowska E. G. Genus Katran-Crambe (Tourn.) L / / Flora of the USSR. – M.-P. 474–491.
Czerniakowska E. G. Spring vegetation of the Kara-Kalpinsky district / / Izvestiya Glavnogo Botanic Garden. – 1925. – Vol. 23. – no. 2.

Plant species named after Czerniakowska
Cousinia czerniakowskae, Kult.
Dactylorhiza czerniakowskae, Aver.
Matthiola czerniakowskae, Botsch & Vved.
Pyrethrum czerniakowskae, Krasch ex Czerniak. 
Veronica czerniakowskiana, Monjuschko — Veronica Czerniakowska

References

1892 births
1942 deaths
Women botanists
Women taxonomists
Soviet botanists
Burials at Serafimovskoe Cemetery
Victims of the Siege of Leningrad
Soviet women scientists
Soviet people of Polish descent